The Afghanistan's Youth Parliament (AYP) is a youth organisation in Afghanistan, consisting of democratically elected members aged between 16 and 35.

Formed in July 2016, the parliament has around 122 members, who are elected from the 34 provinces of Afghanistan. The membership is 33 percent female, 3 percent nomads, three percent disabled people, and 1 percent each Hindu and Sikh. The youth parliament has been established in order to further involve the country's young generation in socio-political affairs.

The 122 members of AYP elected five board members(Mr. Said Kabir Husaini as director, Mr.Mohammad Iqbal Sakhi as 1st Deputy, Ms.Khalida Khalwat as 2end Deputy, Mr. Saif Ul Rahman Shafaq as general Secretary and Ms. Mina Baloch as Deputy Secretary of Afghanistan's Youth Parliament.

The Government of the Islamic Republic of Afghanistan, in order to include young people in social decision-making, bringing them closer to policy-makers of the country, and increase their overall capacity; the Afghanistan Youth Parliament was established through the Deputy Ministry of Youth Affairs, with financial assistance of the United Nation Population Fund (UNFPA) and with the coordination of the Upper House of the Parliament (Mashrano Jirga) in the Year 2016 and the Youth Advisor to H.E President of Islamic Republic of Afghanistan .

Notable members 
Muqadasa Ahmadzai - social and political activist.

References 

Youth model government
Youth-led organizations
Youth empowerment organizations